WMTS-FM (88.3 FM) is a student-run college radio station licensed to Murfreesboro, Tennessee.  The station is currently owned by Middle Tennessee State University (MTSU). It is the fourth attempt by students at MTSU to organize a student-run radio station. A student group, led by Reza Baktar, worked to achieve enough interest and authorization from the Student Government Association. WMTS went on-air in March 1992 on cable TV Channel 38, the Housing and Residential Life Channel, from 8 PM to midnight.

The station's name was initially WNAR, for We Need a Radio or We Need a Reza. In the fall of 1992, the signal was moved to MTSU Channel 8 on the local cable system. WMTS worked to obtain Federal Communications Commission (FCC) approval for an FM license and construction permit during this time. With the donation of tower space and a transmitter from WMOT, WMTS hit the FM band on 88.3 MHz in the summer of 1995. The WNAR call sign was changed to WMTS that fall. 810 WMTS (now WAPB) in Murfreesboro donated the call letters. 

In August 1995, WMTS began normal operation at 200 watts and broadcast in monaural. During the 1996 Christmas break, WMTS went into stereo with processing which increased potential signal coverage and enabled it to sound like other FM stations in the area. It also began constantly broadcasting with a mix of automation and live personalities. WMTS now broadcasts with 680 watts.

WMTS is now also broadcast on WMOT's HD3 sub-channel.

Founders

 Reza Baktar
 James Dibble
 Doug Jones

References

External links
88.3 WMTS

MTS-FM
MTS-FM
Radio stations established in 1995
Middle Tennessee State University